Events in the year 2017 in Vietnam.

Incumbents
Party General Secretary: Nguyễn Phú Trọng
President: Trần Đại Quang 
Prime Minister: Nguyễn Xuân Phúc
Assembly Chairperson: Nguyễn Thị Kim Ngân

Events
APEC Vietnam 2017, a year-long hosting of Asia-Pacific Economic Cooperation (APEC) meetings in Vietnam.

Deaths

10 January – Võ Quý, zoologist (b. 1929).

25 January – Đinh Xuân Lâm, educator and historian (b. 1925).

14 February – Paul Nguyên Van Hòa, Roman Catholic prelate, Bishop of Phan Thiết and Nha Trang (b. 1931).

23 August – Binh Pho, artist in wood (b. 1955).

5 October – François Xavier Nguyên Van Sang, Roman Catholic prelate, Bishop of Thái Bình (b. 1932).

References

 
2010s in Vietnam
Years of the 21st century in Vietnam
Vietnam
Vietnam